The Washington Informer is a weekly newspaper published in Washington, D.C. The Informer is female-owned and is targeted at the African-American population of the D.C. metropolitan area. The publisher is Denise Rolark Barnes, whose father, Calvin W. Rolark (1927–1994), founded the paper in 1964.

At the 2011 Second Annual Ethnic Media Awards competition, the Informer received first-place honors for feature writing and local news.

Statistics
 Total circulation: 50,000
 District of Columbia
 Prince George's County
 Montgomery County
 Northern Virginia
 Trade association memberships
 National Newspaper Publishers Association (NNPA)
 Newspaper Association of America (NAA)
 Maryland, Delaware DC Press Association (MDDC)

See also

Wilhelmina Rolark, former owner of the paper

References

Newspapers published in Washington, D.C.
Weekly newspapers published in the United States
African-American newspapers
African-American history of Washington, D.C.
Publications established in 1964
1964 establishments in Washington, D.C.